Rolf Römer (1935–2000) was a German stage, television and film actor. Römer was a prominent actor of East Germany, appearing in a number of DEFA productions.

He was married to actress Annekathrin Bürger, appearing with her in the 1972 Red Western Tecumseh. He also starred in other westerns including The Sons of Great Bear (1966) and Chingachgook (1967).

Selected filmography
 On the Sunny Side (1962) - Hoff's Friend
 Das Lied vom Trompeter (1964) - Alfons Wieland
 The Sons of Great Bear (1966) - Tobias
 Born in '45 (1966) - Alfred
 Chingachgook (1967) - Deerslayer
 Tecumseh (1972) - Col. Simon McKew
 Walter Defends Sarajevo (1972) - SS Hauptsturmführer Bischoff

References

Bibliography 
 Cowie, Peter. World Filmography: 1967. Fairleigh Dickinson University Press, 1977.

External links 
 

1935 births
2000 deaths
People from Königswinter
People from the Rhine Province
German male stage actors
German male television actors
German male film actors
20th-century German male actors
East German actors

de:Rolf Römer